The 2017 Giro d'Italia was the first of cycling's Grand Tours to take place in the 2017 road cycling season. It was the 100th edition of the Giro d'Italia and took place over 21 stages, beginning in Alghero in Sardinia on 5 May and finishing in Milan on 28 May. The first three stages took place in the island of Sardinia, the next two in the island of Sicilia, with the rest of the race ensuing in continental Italy. The race was won by Tom Dumoulin, who became the first Dutch winner of the Giro.

The following teams and cyclists took part in the 2017 Giro d'Italia.

Teams
All 18 UCI WorldTeams were automatically invited and were obliged to attend the race. Four wildcard UCI Professional Continental teams were also selected.

Cyclists

By starting number

By team

By nationality 
The 195 riders that are competing in the 2017 Giro d'Italia originated from 32 different countries.

References

External links
 

2017 Giro d'Italia
2017